Jon Hall may refer to:

Jon Hall (actor) (1915–1979), American film actor
Jon Hall (basketball) (born 1982), British wheelchair basketball player
Jon Hall (programmer) (born 1950), American programmer and executive director of Linux International
Jon Hall (rugby union) (born 1962), English former rugby union player

See also
John Hall (disambiguation)
Jonathan Hall (disambiguation)